The Montreal Axion were a National Women's Hockey League team (2003 to 2007) located in Montreal, Quebec, Canada. The Axion represented Quebec at the 2005 Esso Women's Nationals. They were previously known as Bonaventure Wingstar (1998–99) and Montreal Wingstar (1999–2003). This team was succeeded as the women's professional hockey team of Montreal by the Montreal Stars in the Canadian Women's Hockey League, starting with the 2007–2008 season.

History
The team evolved in the National Women's Hockey League starting in the 1998–99 season. During the inaugural season, they were named the "Bonaventure Wingstar", then the following season, they became the "Montreal Wingstar". Five years after its creation, in 2003, the team was renamed the Montreal Axion.

Season-by-season

Note: GP = Games played, W = Wins, L = Losses, T = Ties, GF = Goals for, GA = Goals against, Pts = Points.

1998–99
The team takes gains the first championship of its division. During the playoff rounds, the Wingstar manages to steal in the first tour by winning its 2 matches and to consider for championship finale. The team loses the finale match 2–5 against Brampton Thunder which is crowned champion.

1999–2000
The second season is more difficult and the Wingstar escapes from a single point the first position to the Division classification. In playoffs, St-Julie's panthers eliminate Wingstar from the first round:

On Saturday, 4 March 2000: St-Julie Panthers 6–0 Montreal Wingstar
On Sunday, 5 March 2000: Montreal Wingstar 2–1 St-Julie Panthers
in Extra time): Montreal Wingstar 0–1 St-Julie Panthers

2000–01
The big addition of the 2000–01 season is the arrival of the goaltender Manon Rhéaume. Rhéaume performed indeed and help the team to finish at the top of the East Division. The team's attack is not outdone by the presence of Caroline Ouellette and France St-Louis. Behind the bench, Julie Healy acts as coach. Healy sees furthermore in the supervision of Concordia Stingers.

2004–05
Several new players come lent strong hand to the team, among others Gina Kingsbury, Angela Ruggiero, Jenny Lavigne and Annie Desrosiers. For Goaltender, Charline Labonté replaces Manon Rhéaume. The Axion ends in the 1ier Division rank and 3th in the league. Gina Kingsbury score 31 goals and has 29 assist. She finish the season of 30 matches with more than 60 points contributing to the Axion'successes. In the Playoff rounds, Montreal Axion goes to finale game but loses in barrage 5–4 against Toronto Aeros. Also Montreal Axion represents Quebec to the 2005 Esso National Championships.

2005–06
Axion of Montreal wins the National Women's Hockey League Championship by a victory 1–0 against Brampton Thunder in front of 6 000 supporters at Brampton, Ontario. The victorious Goal is scorer by Lisa-Marie Breton and the Shutout goes to Charline Labonté. Axion beforehand finished in the second rank) of its division, behind Ottawa Raiders. It is about the only championship taken gained by Montreal Axion in the history of the National Women's Hockey League.

2006–07
Less fortunate, this season, Montreal Axion ends in the Division 5th rank of the regular season but recovers serial eliminating heats: at first by gaining the East Division Championship then by participating in Championship Finale of National Women's Hockey League. Brampton Thunder triumphs 4–0 against Montreal Axion. Bramton Thunder so takes gains the championship. In the grip of grave difficulty financiers, the National Women's Hockey League stops its activities a little time after

Season standings

NWHL Championships
 1998–99 finalist and lost the final game again Brampton Thunder
 2004–05 finalist and lost the final game again Toronto Aeros
 2005–06 won the championship
 2006–07 finalist and lost the final game again Brampton

2006–07 roster

Notable players
Several former players of Montreal Axion become famous in the new Canadian Women's Hockey League, among others Lisa-Marie Breton-Lebreux, Caroline Ouellette, Kim St-Pierre, Nathalie Déry, Angela Ruggiero, Dominique Thibault, Emmanuelle Blais, Charline Labonté, Sabrina Harbec, Jesse Scanzano, Kelly Sudia and Jenny Lavigne
 Therese Brisson Defender
 Charline Labonte Goalie
 Caroline Ouellette Forward
 Gina Kingsbury Forward
 Angela Ruggiero (2005–2006)
 Jesse Scanzano Forward (2005–06 and 2006–07)
 France St-Louis Forward (1998–99 and 1999–2000)
 Kim St-Pierre Goalie (2006–2007)

Coaching staff
    General Manager: Sylvain Dutil
    Head Coach: Yanick Evola, Julie Healy (for Montreal Wingstar, season 2000–01)
 Assistant Coach: Alain Hénault
 Assistant Coach: Patrick Larivière

Reference

See also
 National Women's Hockey League (1999–2007) (NWHL)
 Montreal Stars

References

External links
 The official site of Montreal Axion 
 NWHL website
 NWHL/COWHL website for 2000–01
 Meg Hewings, Women got game Not just another pretty face-off in Hour.ca, 9 December 2004.

National Women's Hockey League (1999–2007) teams
Axion
Women's ice hockey teams in Canada
Ice hockey clubs established in 1998
1998 establishments in Quebec
Ice hockey clubs disestablished in 2007
2007 disestablishments in Quebec
Women in Montreal